Tothill is an English surname. Notable people with this name include:

 Sir Hugh Tothill (1865–1927), Royal Navy officer
 Jev Tothill (born 1928 or 1929), Canadian politician
 John Douglas Tothill (1888–1969), English entomologist in Canada
 Syd Tothill, founder of Syd's coffee stall in London

See also
Tuthill (disambiguation), which includes a list of people with that surname

References